Tambor Williams (born March 28, 1941) is an American politician. She served in the Colorado House of Representatives from 1997 until 2004, and was the Republican nominee for Lieutenant Governor of Colorado in 2010.

Biography
Williams was born in Washington, D.C. in 1941. She received a Bachelor of Arts from Queens College in 1962, a Master of Arts from Western State College of Colorado in 1971, and a Juris Doctor from the University of Colorado Law School in 1982. Prior to law school, Williams worked as a teacher, school counselor, and university administrator.

Williams registered as a Democrat for a short time, as her partner was running for sheriff as a Democrat.

Williams was elected as a Republican to the Colorado House of Representatives in 1996, from Weld County. She served until 2004, when she was appointed by Governor Bill Owens as executive director of the Colorado Department of Regulatory Agencies.

In August 2010, Williams was selected by gubernatorial candidate Dan Maes to be his running mate. The ticket finished third in the general election.

Personal life
Williams and her husband, Jim Eckersley, have two children: Jennifer and Bill.

Political positions
Williams identifies as pro-life, supporting abortion only in certain cases; although in 1997 she opposed a bill which would have banned partial-birth abortion in the state of Colorado.

Electoral history

References

1941 births
Living people
Candidates in the 2010 United States elections
Colorado Democrats
Colorado lawyers
Colorado Republicans
Members of the Colorado House of Representatives
People from Greeley, Colorado
People from Washington, D.C.
Queens College, City University of New York alumni
Western Colorado University alumni
Women state legislators in Colorado
University of Colorado Law School alumni
20th-century American politicians
20th-century American women politicians
21st-century American politicians
21st-century American women politicians